Dalny is a rural locality (a settlement) in Logoskoye Rural Settlement, Kalachyovsky District, Volgograd Oblast, Russia. The population was 156 as of 2010. There are 4 streets.

Geography 
Dalny is located 93 km southwest of Kalach-na-Donu (the district's administrative centre) by road. Shebalino is the nearest rural locality.

References 

Rural localities in Kalachyovsky District